Piletocera bisignalis is a moth in the family Crambidae. It was described by George Hampson in 1917. It is found in Bali, Indonesia.

References

B
Endemic fauna of Indonesia
Moths of Indonesia
Fauna of Bali
Moths described in 1917
Taxa named by George Hampson